Barbus figuiguensis is a doubtfully distinct ray-finned fish species in the family Cyprinidae.

It is found in Algeria and Morocco. Its natural habitat is inland karsts. It is not considered a threatened species by the IUCN.

The taxonomy and systematics of the Maghreb barbs are subject to considerable dispute. Some authors consider B. figuiguensis a distinct species, while others include it in the Algerian barb (Luciobarbus callensis).

References

F
Fish described in 1913
Taxonomy articles created by Polbot
Taxobox binomials not recognized by IUCN